Labropoulos or Lambropoulos or Lampropoulos is a Greek surname (female version Labropoulou) and may refer to:

Andreas Labropoulos (born 1988), Greek footballer
Emmanuella Lambropoulos (born 1990), Canadian politician
Fotios Lampropoulos (born 1983), Greek basketball player
Giorgos Labropoulos (born 1984), Greek footballer
Konstantinos Lambropoulos (born 1990), Greek footballer
Marilita Lambropoulou (born 1974), Greek actress

Surnames
Patronymic surnames
Greek-language surnames
Surnames of Greek origin